Northern Chaos Gods is the ninth studio album by Norwegian black metal band Immortal. The album was released on 6 July 2018. This is the first album after the departure of Abbath from the band and their first studio album in almost nine years since All Shall Fall (2009), marking the longest gap between two studio albums by Immortal. It is also the first Immortal album to feature Demonaz on vocals and the first one since Blizzard Beasts (1997) to feature him on guitar, and their final album to feature Horgh on drums before being dismissed from the band following a legal dispute with Demonaz over ownership of the band's name. Peter Tägtgren played bass on this album. In an interview before the album's release, Demonaz said he wanted to make the album as "grim, dark and cold as possible".

Track listing

Personnel

Immortal
 Demonaz – vocals, guitars, arranging
 Horgh – drums, arranging

Additional personnel
 Peter Tägtgren – bass, production, mixing
 Jonas Kjellgren – mastering
 Håkon Grav – photography, management, booking
 Jannicke Wiese-Hansen – cover art

Accolades

Charts

References

Immortal (band) albums
2018 albums
Albums produced by Peter Tägtgren